Anne Maarit Mäkinen (born 1 February 1976) is a Finnish former footballer who last played for Swedish club AIK in Stockholm. She was a central midfielder.

Following her debut in June 1991, Mäkinen represented Finland a record 118 times, with 16 goals as of her retirement in 2009. She was the first Finnish player to play in the WUSA, and played collegiately at the University of Notre Dame. Mäkinen played for Washington Freedom, Philadelphia Charge and New Jersey Wildcats. While with Notre Dame, she was the Rookie of the Year in 1997 and the most valuable player in 2000, and was selected to the All Stars of university soccer four years in a row. In 2005, Mäkinen vice-captained Finland to the bronze medals in the European Championship finals, which stands as her nations's best achievement in this sport. While with Umeå IK in Sweden, she twice won the Swedish top league, Damallsvenskan, in 2005 and 2006.

Mäkinen's playing style was very powerful. She was skillful with the ball, and dictated the run of her team's play from central midfield with her effective tackling and telling passes.

Mäkinen's soccer jersey number was retired in 2011 at the IMG Soccer Academy where she trained in her early years, often competing against male players for a challenge.

References

External links
 UEFA profile
 Notre Dame player profile
 Profile at Women's United Soccer Association

1976 births
Living people
Finnish women's footballers
Finland women's international footballers
Notre Dame Fighting Irish women's soccer players
Washington Freedom players
Philadelphia Charge players
Finnish expatriate footballers
Expatriate women's soccer players in the United States
Footballers from Helsinki
Expatriate women's footballers in Sweden
FIFA Century Club
USL W-League (1995–2015) players
Umeå IK players
AIK Fotboll (women) players
Damallsvenskan players
Helsingin Jalkapalloklubi (women) players
Kansallinen Liiga players
Bälinge IF players
New Jersey Wildcats players
Women's association football midfielders
Hermann Trophy women's winners
Women's United Soccer Association players